The Dallas–Fort Worth metroplex, officially designated Dallas–Fort Worth–Arlington by the U.S. Office of Management and Budget, is a conurbated metropolitan statistical area in the U.S. state of Texas encompassing 11 counties and anchored by the major cities of Dallas and Fort Worth. It is the economic and cultural hub of North Texas. Residents of the area also refer to it as DFW (airport code), or the Metroplex. The Dallas–Fort Worth–Arlington metropolitan statistical area's population was 7,637,387 according to the U.S. Census Bureau's 2020 census, making it the most populous metropolitan area in both Texas and the Southern United States, the fourth-largest in the U.S., and the tenth-largest in the Americas. In 2016, the Dallas–Fort Worth metroplex had the highest annual population growth in the United States.

The metropolitan region's economy, also referred to as Silicon Prairie, is primarily based on banking, commerce, insurance, telecommunications, technology, energy, healthcare, medical research, transportation and logistics. As of 2022, Dallas–Fort Worth is home to 23 Fortune 500 companies, the 4th-largest concentration of Fortune 500 companies in the United States behind New York City (62), Chicago (35), and Houston (24). In 2016, the metropolitan economy surpassed Houston to become the fourth-largest in the U.S. The Dallas–Fort Worth metroplex boasted a GDP of just over $620.6 billion in 2020. If the Metroplex were a sovereign state, it would have the twentieth largest economy in the world as of 2019. In 2015, the conurbated metropolitan area would rank the ninth-largest economy if it were a U.S. state. In 2020, Dallas–Fort Worth was recognized as the 36th best metropolitan area for STEM professionals in the U.S.

The Dallas–Fort Worth metroplex comprises the highest concentration of colleges and universities in Texas. The UT Southwestern Medical Center is home to six Nobel Laureates and was ranked No. 1 in the world among healthcare institutions in biomedical sciences. The Metroplex is also the second most popular metropolis for megachurches in Texas (trailing the Greater Houston metropolitan area), ranked the largest Christian metropolitan statistical area in the U.S., and has one of the largest LGBT communities in Texas since 2005.

Etymology 

A portmanteau of metropolis and complex, the term metroplex is credited to Harve Chapman, an executive vice president with Dallas-based Tracy-Locke, one of three advertising agencies that worked with the North Texas Commission (NTC) on strategies to market the region. The NTC copyrighted the term "Southwest Metroplex" in 1972 as a replacement for the previously-ubiquitous "North Texas", which studies had shown lacked identifiability outside the state. In fact, only 38 percent of a survey group identified Dallas and Fort Worth as part of "North Texas", with the Texas Panhandle also a perceived correct answer, being the northernmost region of Texas.

Geography 
The conurbated metropolitan area is larger in area than the U.S. states of Rhode Island and Connecticut combined, and larger than New Jersey. If the metropolitan area were a sovereign state, it would rank the 162nd largest state by total area after Lebanon. The U.S. Office of Management and Budget combines the Dallas–Fort Worth metroplex with the Sherman–Denison metropolitan area and seven micropolitan statistical areas to form the Dallas–Fort Worth TX–OK combined statistical area.

The Dallas–Fort Worth metroplex overlooks mostly prairie land with a few rolling hills dotted by man-made lakes cut by streams, creeks and rivers surrounded by forested land. The Dallas–Fort Worth metroplex is situated in the Texas blackland prairies region, so named for its fertile black soil found especially in the rural areas of Collin, Dallas, Ellis, Hunt, Kaufman, and Rockwall counties.

Many areas of Denton, Johnson, Parker, Tarrant, and Wise counties are located in the Fort Worth Prairie region of North Texas, which has less fertile and more rocky soil than that of the Texas blackland prairie; most of the rural land on the Fort Worth Prairie is ranch land. A large onshore natural gas field, the Barnett Shale, lies underneath this area; Denton, Tarrant and Wise counties feature many natural gas wells. Continuing land use change results in scattered crop fields surrounded by residential or commercial development. South of Dallas and Fort Worth is a line of rugged hills that goes north to south about  that looks similar to the Texas Hill Country  to the south.

Metropolitan divisions and counties 

The Dallas–Fort Worth–Arlington metropolitan statistical area is formed by a combination of two separate metropolitan statistical divisions. The Dallas–Plano–Irving MDA and Fort Worth–Arlington–Grapevine MDA come together to form one full metropolitan area or conurbation.

Dallas–Plano–Irving metropolitan division

Collin County
Dallas County
Denton County
Ellis County
Hunt County
Kaufman County
Rockwall County

Fort Worth–Arlington–Grapevine metropolitan division

Johnson County
Parker County
Tarrant County
Wise County

Climate 
Dallas–Fort Worth has a humid subtropical climate (Köppen climate classification: Cfa).

It is also continental, characterized by a relatively wide annual temperature range for the latitude. The Dallas–Fort Worth metroplex is located at the lower end of Tornado Alley, and can experience extreme weather.

In the Metroplex, summers are very hot and humid, although low humidity characteristics of desert locations can appear at any time of the year. Heat indices regularly surpass  at the height of summer.

Winters in the area are cool to mild, with occasional cold spells. The average date of first frost is November 12, and the average date of last frost is March 12. The normal daily average temperature in January is  but sharp swings in temperature can occur, as strong cold fronts known as "Blue Northers" pass through the Metroplex, forcing daytime highs below the  mark for several days at a time and often between days with high temperatures above . Some areas in the region, however, receive more than that, while other areas receive negligible snowfall or none at all.

Principal communities 
The following are cities and towns categorized based on the latest population estimates from the North Central Texas Council of Governments (as of January 1, 2018). No population estimates are released for census-designated places (CDPs), which are marked with an asterisk (*). These places are categorized based on their 2010 census population.

Places with more than 100,000 inhabitants 

Places designated "principal cities" by the U.S. Office of Management and Budget are italicized.

1,000,000+

Dallas (1,343,573)

500,000–999,999

Fort Worth (958,585)

200,000–499,999

Arlington (398,854)
Plano (289,677)
Garland (245,290)
Irving (257,629)
Frisco (225,060)
McKinney (206,654)
Grand Prairie (200,200)

100,000–199,999

Mesquite (153,190)
Denton (147,816)
Carrollton (139,248)
Richardson (125,544)
Lewisville (110,077)
Allen (109,039)

Places with 10,000 to 99,999 inhabitants 

 Addison
 Anna
 Azle
 Balch Springs
 Bedford
 Benbrook
 Burleson
 Cedar Hill
 Celina
 Cleburne
 Colleyville
 Coppell
 Corinth
 Crowley
 DeSoto
 Duncanville
 Ennis
 Euless
 Farmers Branch
 Flower Mound
 Forest Hill
 Forney
 Glenn Heights
 Grapevine
 Greenville
 Haltom City
 Highland Village
 Hurst
 Keller
 Lancaster
 Little Elm
 Mansfield
 Midlothian
 Mineral Wells (partial)
 Murphy
 North Richland Hills
 Princeton
 Prosper
 Red Oak
 Rockwall
 Rowlett
 Royse City
 Sachse
 Saginaw
 Seagoville
 Southlake
 Terrell
 The Colony
 Trophy Club
 University Park
 Watauga
 Waxahachie
 Weatherford
 White Settlement
 Wylie

Places with fewer than 10,000 inhabitants 

 Aledo
 Alma
 Alvarado
 Alvord
 Annetta North
 Annetta South
 Annetta
 Argyle
 Aubrey
 Aurora
 Bardwell
 Bartonville
 Blue Mound
 Blue Ridge
 Boyd
 Briar*
 Briaroaks
 Bridgeport
 Caddo Mills
 Campbell
 Celeste
 Chico
 Cockrell Hill
 Combine
 Commerce
 Cool
 Cooper
 Copper Canyon
 Corral City
 Cottonwood
 Covington
 Crandall
 Cresson (partial) 
 Cross Roads
 Cross Timber
 Dalworthington Gardens
 Decatur
 DeCordova
 Dennis
 DISH
 Double Oak
 Eagle Mountain*
 Edgecliff Village
 Everman
 Fairview
 Farmersville
 Fate
 Ferris
 Garrett
 Glen Rose
 Godley
 Granbury
 Grandview
 Grays Prairie
 Gun Barrel City
 Hackberry
 Haslet
 Hawk Cove
 Heath
 Hebron
 Hickory Creek
 Highland Park
 Hudson Oaks
 Hutchins
 Italy
 Itasca
 Josephine
 Joshua
 Justin
 Kaufman
 Keene
 Kemp
 Kennedale
 Knollwood
 Krugerville
 Krum
 Lake Bridgeport
 Lake Dallas
 Lake Worth
 Lakeside
 Lakewood Village
 Lavon
 Leonard
 Lincoln Park
 Lone Oak
 Lowry Crossing
 Lucas
 Mabank (partial) 
 Maypearl
 McLendon-Chisholm
 Melissa
 Milford
 Millsap
 Mobile City
 Nevada
 New Fairview
 New Hope
 Newark
 Neylandville
 Northlake
 Oak Grove
 Oak Leaf
 Oak Point
 Oak Ridge
 Ovilla
 Palmer
 Pantego
 Paradise
 Parker
 Pecan Acres*
 Pecan Hill
 Pelican Bay
 Pilot Point
 Ponder
 Post Oak Bend City
 Princeton
 Providence Village
 Quinlan
 Rendon*
 Reno
 Rhome
 Richland Hills
 Rio Vista
 River Oaks
 Roanoke
 Rosser
 Runaway Bay
 Saint Paul
 Sanctuary
 Sanger
 Sansom Park
 Scurry
 Shady Shores
 Springtown
 Sunnyvale
 Talty
 Union Valley
 Van Alstyne (partial)
 Venus
 West Tawakoni
 Westlake
 Weston
 Westover Hills
 Westworth Village
 Willow Park
 Wilmer
 Wolfe City

Unincorporated places 

 Ables Springs
 Acton
 Avalon
 Bolivar
 Brock
 Cash
 Copeville
 Elizabethtown
 Elmo
 Floyd
 Forreston
 Garner
 Greenwood
 Heartland
 Ike
 Lantana
 Lillian
 Merit
 Paloma Creek
 Peaster
 Poetry
 Poolville
 Rockett
 Sand Branch
 Savannah
 Slidell
 Telico
 Westminster
 Whitt
 Trumbull

Demographics 

At the 2020 U.S. census 7,637,387 people lived in the area, up from 6,371,773 in 2010, and 2,974,805 in 1970. In 2020, the Dallas–Fort Worth metroplex's racial composition was 42% non-Hispanic white, 16% Black or African American, 8% Asian, 3-4% two or more races, and 29% Hispanic or Latino American of any race. According to information gathered from the North Texas Commission, the Metroplex's racial and ethnic makeup was 46% non-Hispanic white, 15% Black or African American, 7% Asian American, and 3% from other races in 2017. Ethnically, Hispanics and Latinos of any race made up 29% of the metropolitan population. From 2010 to 2017, Hispanics and Latinos increased an estimated 38.9% followed by Blacks and African Americans.

In 2015, an estimated 101,588 foreign-born residents moved to the Metroplex. Of the immigrant population, 44.1% were from Latin America, 35.8% Asia, 7.1% Europe, and 13.1% Africa. In 2010, 77,702 foreign nationals immigrated; approximately 50.6% came from Latin America, 33.0% from Asia, 7.3% Europe, and 9.1% Africa. During the 2020 American Community Survey, an estimated 18.5% of its population were foreign-born, with 56% from Latin America, 30% Asia, 8% Africa, 4% Europe, and 1% elsewhere from North America.

The median household income in Dallas–Fort Worth was higher than the state average in 2017, and its unemployment and poverty rate was lower. The median income for males was $51,498 and $44,207 for females. In 2019, the per capita income of DFW was $72,265. In 2010, the median income for a household in the metropolitan area was $48,062, and the median income for a family was $55,263. Males had a median income of $39,581 versus $27,446 for females. The per capita income for the Metroplex altogether was $21,839.

The Dallas–Fort Worth metroplex's religious population are predominantly Christian and the largest metro area that identify with the religion in the United States (78%). Methodist, Baptist, Presbyterian, and Catholic churches are prominent in many cities and towns in the metropolitan region. The Methodist and Baptist communities anchor two of the area's major private universities (Southern Methodist University and Dallas Baptist University). Non-Christian faiths including Islam, Judaism, Hinduism, Sikhism, Buddhism, and contemporary paganism collectively form a little over 4% of the religious population.

Combined statistical area 
The Dallas–Fort Worth, TX–OK combined statistical area is made up of 20 counties in North Central Texas and one county in South Central Oklahoma. The statistical area includes two metropolitan areas and seven micropolitan areas. The population density was 485 people per square mile according to estimates from the U.S. Census Bureau.

Metropolitan statistical areas (MSAs) 
 Dallas–Fort Worth–Arlington (Collin, Dallas, Denton, Ellis, Hunt, Johnson, Kaufman, Parker, Rockwall, Tarrant, and Wise counties)
 Sherman-Denison (Grayson County); population 136,212 (2019 estimate)

Micropolitan statistical areas (μSAs) 
 Athens (Henderson County); population 82,737 (2019 estimate)
 Bonham (Fannin County) (delineated and added in 2015); population 35,514 (2019 estimate)
 Corsicana (Navarro County); population 50,113 (2019 estimate)
 Durant, OK (Bryan County, Oklahoma); population 47,995 (2019 estimate)
 Gainesville (Cooke County); population 41,257 (2019 estimate)
 Granbury (Hood County) (delineated and added in 2018); population 61,643 (2019 estimate)
 Mineral Wells (Palo Pinto County); population 29,189 (2019 estimate)

Demographics 
At the 2000 U.S. census, there were 5,487,956 people, 2,006,665 households, and 1,392,540 families residing within the CSA. The racial makeup of the CSA was 70.41% white, 13.34% African American, 0.59% Native American, 3.58% Asian, 0.08% Pacific Islander, 9.62% from other races, and 2.39% from two or more races. Hispanics or Latinos of any race were 20.83% of the population. The median income for a household in the CSA was $43,836, and the median income for a family was $50,898. Males had a median income of $37,002 versus $25,553 for females. The per capita income for the CSA was $20,460.

At the 2020 census, the DFW CSA had a population of 8,121,108 (though a July 1, 2015 estimate placed the population at 7,504,362). In 2018 it had an estimated 7,994,963 residents. The American Community Survey determined 18% of the population was foreign-born. The median household income was $67,589 and the per capita income was $34,455. An estimated 11.5% lived below the poverty line. The median age of the DFW CSA was 35.3.

Urban areas within 

At the core of the Dallas–Fort Worth combined statistical area (CSA) lies the Dallas–Fort Worth–Arlington, TX urban area, the sixth-most populous in the United States. Within the boundaries of the CSA the Census Bureau defines 31 other urban areas as well, some of which form the core of their own metro or micro statistical areas separate from the Dallas–Fort Worth metropolitan statistical area. Urban areas situated primarily outside the Dallas–Fort Worth metropolitan statistical area but within the CSA are identified with a cross (†) in the table below.

Economy 

The cities of Dallas and Fort Worth are the two central cities of the Metroplex, with Arlington being a third economically important city; it is a center for sporting events, tourism and manufacturing. Most other incorporated cities in the Metroplex are "bedroom communities" serving largely as residential and small-business centers, though there are several key employers in these regions. Due to the large number of smaller, less well-known cities, Metroplex residents commonly divide the region roughly in half along Texas Interstate 35, which runs north–south, splitting into two 'branches' (I-35E in Dallas and I-35W in Fort Worth) through the Metroplex. They refer to places as being on the "Dallas side" or the "Fort Worth side", or in "the Arlington area", which is almost directly south of the airport; cities in the Arlington area form the Mid-Cities. It is nominally between the two major east–west interstates in the region (I-20, passing to the south of both downtowns, and I-30, connecting Dallas and Fort Worth city centers).

Business management and operations play a central role in the area's economy. Dallas and its suburbs have the third-largest concentration of corporate headquarters in the United States. Moreover, it is the only metro area in the country home to three of the top-ten largest Fortune 500 companies by revenue. The area continues to draw corporate relocation from across the nation, and especially from California. From late 2018 to early 2019, both McKesson and Charles Schwab announced they would be relocating from San Francisco to the DFW area. Later in 2019, San Francisco-based Uber announced a massive corporate expansion just east of downtown Dallas.

Banking and finance play a key role in the area's economy. DFW recently surpassed Chicago to become the second-largest financial services hub in the nation, eclipsed only by New York. Bank of America, JP Morgan Chase, Liberty Mutual, Goldman Sachs, State Farm, TD Ameritrade, Charles Schwab, and Fidelity Investments maintain significant operations in the area. The Metroplex also contains the largest Information Technology industry base in the state (often referred to as Silicon Prairie or the Telecom Corridor, especially when referring to US-75 through Richardson, Plano and Allen just north of Dallas itself). This area has a large number of corporate IT projects and the presence of numerous electronics, computing and telecommunication firms such as Microsoft, Texas Instruments, HP Enterprise Services, Dell Services, Samsung, Nokia, Cisco, Fujitsu, i2, Frontier, Alcatel, Ericsson, CA, Google, T-Mobile US and Verizon. AT&T, the second largest telecommunications company in the world, is headquartered at the Whitacre Tower in downtown Dallas. ExxonMobil and McKesson, respectively the 2nd and 7th largest Fortune 500 companies by revenue, are headquartered in Irving, Texas. Fluor, the largest engineering & construction company in the Fortune 500, is also headquartered in Irving. In October 2016, Jacobs Engineering, a Fortune 500 company and one of the world's largest engineering companies, relocated from Pasadena, California to Dallas. Toyota USA, in 2016, relocated its corporate headquarters to Plano, Texas. Southwest Airlines is headquartered in Dallas. The airline has more than 53,000 employees as of October 2016 and operates more than 3,900 departures a day during peak travel season.

On the other side of the Metroplex, the Texas farming and ranching industry is based in Fort Worth, though the area's economy is diverse. American Airlines, the largest airline in the world, recently completed their new $350M corporate HQ complex in Fort Worth. American Airlines is the largest employer in the Metroplex. Several major defense manufacturers, including Lockheed Martin, Bell Helicopter Textron, and Raytheon, maintain significant operations in the Metroplex, primarily on the "Fort Worth side." They are concentrated along State Highway 170 near I-35W, commonly called the "Alliance Corridor" due to its proximity to the Fort Worth Alliance regional airport.

Changes in house prices for the Metroplex are publicly tracked on a regular basis using the Case–Shiller index; the statistic is published by Standard & Poor's and is also a component of S&P's 20-city composite index of the value of the U.S. residential real estate market.

Sports 
The Metroplex is one of the 13 U.S. metropolitan areas that has a team in each of the four major professional sports leagues. Major professional sports first came to the area in 1952, when the Dallas Texans competed in the National Football League for one season. In 1960, major professional sports returned when the Dallas Cowboys began competing in the National Football League and the Dallas Texans began competing in the American Football League. The Dallas Texans later relocated to Kansas City and became the Chiefs. In 1972, Major League Baseball's Washington Senators moved to Arlington to become the Texas Rangers, named after the statewide law enforcement agency. The National Basketball Association expanded into North Texas in 1980 when the Dallas Mavericks were added to the league. The fourth sport was added in 1993 when the Minnesota North Stars of the National Hockey League moved to Dallas, becoming the Dallas Stars.

The Major League Soccer team FC Dallas is based in Frisco, and the Dallas Wings of the WNBA play in Arlington. The area is also home to many minor-league professional teams, and four colleges that compete in NCAA Division I athletics. A NASCAR Cup Series race is hosted annually at Texas Motor Speedway, the AAA Texas 500, and two PGA Tour events are held annually in the Metroplex, the AT&T Byron Nelson and the Colonial National Invitation Tournament. The Metroplex has hosted many premiere sports events on both an annual and one-time basis.

Major professional sports teams

^- Indicates year team relocated to the area

Other notable professional and amateur teams

^- Indicates year team relocated to the area

Division I college athletics

The headquarters for both the Big 12 and American Athletic Conference are located in Irving, Conference USA headquarters are in Dallas and the Southland Conference headquarters are in Frisco.

Sports events hosted
Note: Venues are listed with their current names, not necessarily those in use when an event took place.

The region is set to host multiple matches during the 2026 FIFA World Cup.

Education

Notable colleges and universities

Politics 

The Republican Party has historically been dominant in the Dallas–Fort Worth area, including in presidential elections, although recently since 2016, Democrats have been making inroads in the suburbs. The DFW Area is considered a bellwether polity in recent history. Factors causing this shift include an influx of Democratic-voting younger professionals and families from Democratic states, as well as a more diverse population (with increasing numbers of African-Americans along with recent immigrants and their children). Democratic voters dominate a majority of areas in the large cities of Dallas, Fort Worth, Grand Prairie, and Arlington (especially areas east of Interstate 35W). Republicans dominate North Dallas, western Fort Worth, along with most suburbs and exurbs of the Metroplex.

Media 
The cities of Dallas and Fort Worth have their own newspapers, The Dallas Morning News and the Fort Worth Star-Telegram, respectively. Historically, the two papers had readership primarily in their own counties. As the two cities' suburbs have grown together in recent years (and especially since the demise of the Dallas Times Herald in 1991), many sites sell both papers. This pattern of crossover has been repeated in other print media, radio, and television.

Since the 1970s all of the television stations and most of the FM radio stations have chosen to transmit from Cedar Hill so as to serve the entire market, and are programmed likewise. There has been a rise in "80–90 move-ins", whereby stations have been moved from distant markets, in some cases as far away as Oklahoma, and relicensed to anonymous small towns in the Metroplex to serve as additional DFW stations. According to RadioTime, the market had 38 AM stations, 58 FM stations (many of them class Cs), and 18 full-power television stations. Per another study the area has a total of 62 FM stations and 40 AM stations as of 2020.

Dallas–Fort Worth is the fifth-largest television market in the United States, behind only New York City, Los Angeles, Chicago, and Philadelphia. Two of the Metroplex's AM radio stations, 820 WBAP and 1080 KRLD, are 50,000-watt stations with coverage of much of the North American continent and beyond during nighttime hours. The South Asian population (Indian Sub-continent) has increased considerably in the DFW metroplex. They have the FM 104.9 radio channel and 700 AM radio. Recently Sony TV, a subsidiary of Sony TV Asia, launched its FTA (free to Air OTA) channel on 44.2 station in DFW. It was one of the two locations they chose in the United States, the other being New York City, where there is also a large South Asian demographic.

TV stations
The following are full-powered stations serving the Dallas–Fort Worth television market. Network owned-and-operated stations are highlighted in bold.

Transportation

The Dallas/Fort Worth International Airport (IATA airport code: DFW), located between the cities of Dallas and Fort Worth, is the largest and busiest airport in the State of Texas. At  of total land area, DFW is also the second-largest airport in the country and the sixth-largest in the world. It is the third-busiest airport in the world in terms of aircraft movements and the world's seventh-busiest by passenger traffic, transporting 62.9 million passengers in FY 2014. Based in Fort Worth, American Airlines' headquarters are adjacent to DFW. Recently having regained the title as the largest airline in the world in terms of both passengers transported and fleet size, American is a predominant leader in domestic routes and operations.

The Dallas Love Field Airport (IATA airport code: DAL) is located in northwest Dallas. Based in Dallas, Southwest Airlines is headquartered next to Love Field.

 
The Dallas–Fort Worth area has thousands of lane-miles of freeways and interstates. The Metroplex has the second-largest number of freeway-miles per capita in the nation, behind only the Kansas City metropolitan area. As in most major metropolitan areas in Texas, most interstates and freeways have access or frontage roads where most of the businesses are located; these access roads have slip ramps allowing traffic to transition between the freeway and access road. North–south interstates include I-35 and I-45. East–west routes include I-30 and I-20. I-35 splits into I-35E and I-35W from Denton to Hillsboro: I-35W goes through Fort Worth while I-35E goes through Dallas. (This is one of only two examples of an interstate splitting off into branches and then rejoining as one; the other such split is in Minneapolis-St. Paul where I-35E goes into St. Paul and I-35W goes through Minneapolis.) I-30 connects Dallas and Fort Worth, and I-45 connects Dallas to Houston. The "multiple-of-5" numbers used for the interstate designations are notable, as these numbers were designed to be used for major multi-state arteries of the U.S. Interstate Highway System. The North Texas region is the terminus for two of them, and I-45 is located only within Texas.

HOV lanes exist along I-35E, I-30, I-635, US 67, and US 75. I-20 bypasses both Dallas and Fort Worth to the south while its loop, I-820, goes around Fort Worth. I-635 splits to the north of I-20 and loops around east and north Dallas, ending at SH 121 north of DFW Airport. I-35E, Loop 12, and Spur 408 ultimately connect to I-20 southwest of Dallas, completing the west bypass loop around Dallas. A large number of construction projects are planned or are already underway in the region to alleviate congestion. Due largely to funding issues, many of the new projects involve building new tollways or adding tolled express lanes to existing highways, which are managed by the North Texas Tollway Authority. It was originally established to manage the Dallas North Tollway and oversees several other toll projects in the area.

Public transit

Public transit options continue to expand significantly throughout the Metroplex. However, it is limited in several outlying and rural suburbs. Dallas County and portions of Collin and Rockwall counties have bus service and light rail operated by Dallas Area Rapid Transit (DART), covering thirteen member cities. DART's rail network currently sprawls for 93 miles throughout the area. The Red Line extends north to Plano and southwest to Westmoreland Road. The Blue Line reaches from Rowlett in the northeast to the University of North Texas at Dallas campus near I-20 in the south. The 28-mile Green Line, which opened in December 2010, connects Carrollton in the northwest through downtown Dallas to Pleasant Grove in the southeast. The Orange Line, which completed expansion in 2014, parallels the Red Line from Plano to downtown Dallas and the Green Line from downtown Dallas to Northwest Hwy before extending through the Las Colinas area of Irving to reach DFW International Airport.

Denton County has bus service limited to Denton, Highland Village, and Lewisville (with commuter service to downtown Dallas) provided by the Denton County Transportation Authority (DCTA). The A-train, a diesel commuter rail line, parallels I-35E to connect Denton, Highland Village, Lewisville, and Carrollton. Several smaller towns along this line, Corinth, Shady Shores, and Lake Dallas, voted to abstain from DCTA and do not have stations. There is an across-the-platform transfer in Carrollton to the DART Green Line. A-Train service began June 20, 2011.

Tarrant County has bus services operated by Trinity Metro (formerly the Fort Worth Transportation Authority, popularly known as 'The T'), available only in Fort Worth. It additionally operates TEXRail commuter rail, which serves to connect downtown Fort Worth with DFW Airport and the DART Orange Line. The diesel commuter train that serves Fort Worth and its eastern suburbs is operated as the Trinity Railway Express; it connects downtown Fort Worth to downtown Dallas, where it links to the DART light rail system. A station near its midpoint, Centerport, also serves DFW Airport via a free airport shuttle bus. The TRE is jointly owned by FWTA and DART. Amtrak serves two stations in the Metroplex—Dallas Union Station and Fort Worth Central Station. Both are served by the Texas Eagle route, which operates daily between Chicago and San Antonio (continuing on to Los Angeles three days a week), though only Fort Worth is served by the Fort Worth-Oklahoma City Heartland Flyer.

As of 2016 the Taiwanese airline EVA Air operates a shuttle bus service from George Bush Intercontinental Airport in Houston to Richardson, so that Dallas-based customers may fly on its services to and from Houston.

See also 

 Greater Dallas Korean American Chamber of Commerce
 List of museums in North Texas
 List of metropolitan statistical areas
 Texas Triangle

Notes

References

External links 

 Dallas–Fort Worth Property Tax Rates by City and County

 
Geography of Collin County, Texas
Geography of Dallas County, Texas
Geography of Denton County, Texas
Geography of Ellis County, Texas
Geography of Hunt County, Texas
Geography of Johnson County, Texas
Geography of Kaufman County, Texas
Geography of Parker County, Texas
Geography of Rockwall County, Texas
Geography of Tarrant County, Texas
Geography of Wise County, Texas
Metropolitan areas of Texas
Regions of Texas